Livin' It Up! is the fourteenth semi-based "lifestyle" studio album by Sammy Hagar and the Waboritas. While writing with Kenny Chesney and covering Toby Keith, Hagar began singing about enjoying the life of a beach dweller. It was vaguely reminiscent of Jimmy Buffett's career, and Hagar even used this time as an opportunity to meet more easy-going party fans as he went on a brief tour with Chesney.

Song information
"I Love This Bar" was previously recorded by Toby Keith for his 2003 album Shock'n Y'all.
"Rainy Day Women #12 & 35" is a cover of a Bob Dylan song, originally released on his 1966 album Blonde on Blonde.
The first version of the song "Halfway to Memphis" was recorded for the Hagar's album Not 4 Sale.
"Let Me Take You There" was called "I'll Take You There" when it was recorded by the soul/gospel family band the Staple Singers. The song was included on the group's 1972 album Be Altitude: Respect Yourself.

Track listing

Personnel
 Sammy Hagar - lead vocals, guitar
 David (Bro) Lauser - drums, percussion, backing vocals
 Vic (Tore Up) Johnson - electric and acoustic guitar, backing vocals
 Mona Gnader - bass guitar, backing vocals

Additional personnel
Gibby Ross - timbales, congas, shaker, cowbell, tambourine
Bob Daspit -  guitar, slide guitar, percussion, backing vocals
Nicole Summerwood - backing vocals
Roy Rogers - slide guitar
Rosendo Rodriguez Mariachi Band
Tim Hockenberry - trombone, piccolo trumpet
Austin de Lone - piano
Dave Zirbel - pedal steel guitar
Aaron Hagar - backing vocals and lead vocal duet on "Someday"
Kari Hagar - backing vocals
Technical
Will Blochinger - photography

Chart performance
The album premiered at #50 on the Billboard Charts in 2006, with 16,000+ sold.

References

External links
 Lyrics from Hagar's official web site

2006 albums
Sammy Hagar albums